Elverum IL is a Norwegian alliance sports club from Elverum in Innlandet. It was founded in 1892, and has sections for handball, association football, ski jumping, gymnastics and swimming.

Handball

Football

Other sports
Ski jumper Hein-Arne Mathiesen represented the club. The club was formerly active in athletics, where Bjørn Gundersen represented the club.

References

Official site

Sports clubs established in 1892
Elverum
Sport in Hedmark
Defunct athletics clubs in Norway
1892 establishments in Norway